Black and White (French: Le blanc et le noir) is a 1931 French comedy film directed by Marc Allégret and Robert Florey and starring Raimu, André Alerme and Louis Baron fils. Described as a "feeble racist comedy" it was the feature screen debut to the comedian Fernandel. It is an adaptation of the 1922 play of the same title by Sacha Guitry, who wrote the screenplay.

It was shot at the Billancourt Studios in Paris. Marc Allégret also worked as art director, designing the film's sets.

Cast
 Raimu as Marcel Desnoyers 
 André Alerme as George Samoy 
 Louis Baron fils as H. Massicourt - Le père de Marguerite' 
 Charles Lamy as Le docteur Leclerc 
 Louis Kerly as Arthur 
 Fernandel as Le groom vierge 
 Paul Pauley as M. Timiriou - le chef de bureau 
 Suzanne Dantès as Marguerite Desnoyers 
 Irène Wells as Peggy Samoy 
 Charlotte Clasis as Mme Massicaut 
 Pauline Carton as Marie - la bonne 
 Monette Dinay as Joséphine 
 Les Jackson Girls as Elles-mêmes - dans leur numéro

References

Bibliography 
 Crisp, Colin. French Cinema—A Critical Filmography: Volume 1, 1929–1939. Indiana University Press, 2015.

External links 
 

1931 films
1931 comedy films
French comedy films
1930s French-language films
Films directed by Marc Allégret
Films directed by Robert Florey
Films shot at Billancourt Studios
French films based on plays
Films based on works by Sacha Guitry
1930s French films